Central America or Central American may refer to:

Central America
 Central America, a central region of the Americas, sometimes including the Caribbean, sometimes considered part of North America
 Central America bioregion
 Federal Republic of Central America (1836–1841), a former republic comprising Los Altos (now Chiapas, Mexico), Guatemala, El Salvador, Honduras, Nicaragua and Costa Rica
 Greater Republic of Central America (1896–1898), a former republic comprising Honduras, Nicaragua, El Salvador
 Central American Integration System, the supranational organization of Central America
 Central American Parliament, the governing body of the supranational organization
 SS Central America, a steamship which sailed along the American coasts in the 1850s and sank in 1857
 Central America (game), a boardgame
 Central United States, a region of the United States of America

Central American
 North-Central American English, a dialect of American English
 Central American Spanish, a dialect of Spanish found in Central America
 Central American Games, multisport quadrennial region championship for the members of the Central American Sports Organization
 Central American Seaway, a natural waterway that separated South and North America before the Isthmus of Panama existed
 Central American Adventist University, in Costa Rica
 Central American University, in San Salvador, El Salvador
 Central American University (Managua), in Managua, Nicaragua

Other uses
 Central American campaign (disambiguation)
 Central American Championships (disambiguation)

See also
 History of Central America
 Americas (terminology)
 Mesoamerica (disambiguation)
 Middle America (disambiguation)
 North America (disambiguation)
 Caribbean (disambiguation)
 America (disambiguation)